Harsin (also Romanized as Harsīn; also known as ’Āresīn) is a village in Mehran Rural District, in the Central District of Bandar Lengeh County, Hormozgan Province, Iran. At the 2006 census, its population was 195, in 37 families.

References 

Populated places in Bandar Lengeh County